N.W.A (an abbreviation for Niggaz Wit Attitudes) was an American hip hop group formed in Compton, California. They were among the earliest and most significant popularizers and controversial figures of the gangsta rap subgenre, and the group is widely considered one of the greatest and most influential groups in the history of hip hop music.

Active from 1987 to 1991, the rap group endured controversy owing to its music's explicit lyrics, which many viewed as being misogynistic, as well as to its glorification of drugs and crime. The group was subsequently banned from many mainstream American radio stations. In spite of this, the group has sold over 10 million units in the United States alone. Drawing on its members' own experiences of racism and excessive policing, the group made inherently political music. The group's members were known for their deep hatred of the police system, which has sparked much controversy over the years.

The original lineup, formed in early 1987, consisted of Arabian Prince, Dr. Dre, Eazy-E, and Ice Cube, with DJ Yella and MC Ren joining later that year. They released their first compilation album as a group in 1987 called N.W.A. and the Posse, which peaked at No. 39 on Billboard magazine's Top R&B/Hip-Hop Albums chart. Arabian Prince left shortly after the release of N.W.A's debut studio album, Straight Outta Compton, in 1988, with Ice Cube following suit in December 1989. Eazy-E, Ice Cube, MC Ren and Dr. Dre later became platinum-selling solo artists in their own right in the 1990s. The group's debut album marked the beginning of the new gangsta rap era as the production and social commentary in their lyrics were revolutionary within the genre. N.W.A's second studio album, Niggaz4Life, was the first hardcore rap album to reach number one on the Billboard 200 sales charts.

Rolling Stone ranked N.W.A at number 83 on its list of the "100 Greatest Artists of All Time". In 2016, the group was inducted into the Rock and Roll Hall of Fame, following three previous nominations.

History

Formation and "Panic Zone" (1987–1988)

N.W.A was assembled by Compton-based Eazy-E, who co-founded Ruthless Records with Jerry Heller. Eazy-E sought an introduction to Steve Yano. Although Yano initially rebuffed him, he was impressed by Eazy-E's persistence, and arranged a meeting with Dr. Dre. Initially, N.W.A consisted of Eazy-E and Dr. Dre. Together with fellow producer Arabian Prince, Ice Cube was added to the roster after he had started out as a rapper for the group C.I.A. Dre later brought DJ Yella on board as well.

Dre and Yella were both formerly members of the World Class Wreckin' Cru as DJs and producers. Ruthless released the single "Panic Zone" in 1987 with Macola Records, which was later included on the compilation album N.W.A. and the Posse. N.W.A was still in its developing stages, and is only credited on three of the eleven tracks, notably the uncharacteristic record "Panic Zone", "8-Ball", and "Dopeman", which marked the first collaboration of Arabian Prince, DJ Yella, Dr. Dre, and Ice Cube. Mexican rapper Krazy-Dee co-wrote "Panic Zone", which was originally called "Hispanic Zone", but the title was later changed when Dr. Dre advised Krazy-Dee that the word "hispanic" would hinder sales. Also included was Eazy-E's solo track "Boyz-n-the-Hood".

Straight Outta Compton, Eazy-Duz-It (1988–1989)

N.W.A released their debut studio album, Straight Outta Compton, in 1988. With its famous opening salvo of three tracks, the group reflected the rising anger of the urban youth. The opening song "Straight Outta Compton" introduced the group, "Fuck tha Police" protested police brutality and racial profiling, and "Gangsta Gangsta" painted the worldview of the inner-city youth. While the group was later credited with pioneering the burgeoning subgenre of gangsta rap, N.W.A referred to their music as "reality rap".

Twenty-seven years later, member and co-producer of the Straight Outta Compton film, Ice Cube, commented "they were talking about what really led into the style that we ended up doing, which is now called hardcore gangster rap." Dr. Dre and DJ Yella, as HighPowered Productions, composed the beats for each song, with Dre making occasional rapping appearances. The D.O.C., Ice Cube, and MC Ren wrote most of the group's lyrics, including "Fuck tha Police", perhaps the group's most notorious song, which brought them into conflict with various law enforcement agencies. Under pressure from Focus on the Family, Milt Ahlerich, an assistant director of the FBI sent a letter to Ruthless and its distributing company Priority Records, advising the rappers that "advocating violence and assault is wrong and we in the law enforcement community take exception to such action." This letter can still be seen at the Rock and Roll Hall of Fame in Cleveland, Ohio. Policemen refused to provide security for the group's concerts, hurting their plans to tour. Nonetheless, the FBI's letter only served to draw more publicity to the group.

Straight Outta Compton was also one of the first albums to adhere to the new Parental Advisory label scheme, then still in its early stages: the label at the time consisted of "WARNING: Moderate impact coarse language and/or themes" only. However, the taboo nature of N.W.A's music was the most important factor of its mass appeal. Media coverage compensated for the group's lack of airplay, and its album eventually went double platinum. One month after Straight Outta Compton, Eazy-E's solo debut Eazy-Duz-It was released. The album was dominated by Eazy's persona (MC Ren was the only guest rapper) but behind the scenes it was a group effort.

Music was handled by Dr. Dre and DJ Yella; the lyrics were largely written by MC Ren, with contributions from Ice Cube and The D.O.C. The album was another double platinum success for Ruthless (in addition to girl group J.J. Fad in 1988 and singer Michel'le in 1989). 1989 saw the re-issue of N.W.A and the Posse and Straight Outta Compton on CD, and the release of The D.O.C.'s No One Can Do It Better. His album was essentially a collaboration with Dr. Dre and notably free of "gangsta rap" content, including the N.W.A posse cut "The Grand Finalé". It became another #1 album for the record label.

===100 Miles And Runnin''' and Niggaz4Life (1989–1991)===
Ice Cube left the group in December 1989 over royalty disputes; having written almost half of the lyrics on Straight Outta Compton himself, he felt he was not getting a fair share of the profits. A lawsuit brought by Ice Cube against band manager Jerry Heller was settled out of court. He wasted little time putting together his solo debut, 1990's AmeriKKKa's Most Wanted, but he avoided mentioning his former label mates. N.W.A's title track from their 1990 EP 100 Miles and Runnin', however, included a diss towards Cube:"We started with five, but yo / One couldn't take it—So now it's four / Cuz the fifth couldn't make it." The video for the song depicted the remaining members of N.W.A together in a jail cell, while an Ice Cube look-alike is released.

Also heard on the EP (which found its way on the Efil4zaggin album) was "Real Niggaz", a full-blown diss to Ice Cube where the remaining members accuse him of cowardice, and question his authenticity, longevity and originality: "How the fuck you think a rapper lasts / With your ass sayin' shit that was said in the past / Yo, be original, your shit is sloppy / Get off the dick, you motherfuckin' carbon-copy", and "We started out with too much cargo / So I'm glad we got rid of Benedict Arnold, yo."The song "100 Miles and Runnin'" was Dr. Dre's final uptempo recording, which had been a common feature of late 1980s hip hop. After this, he focused on a midtempo, synthesizer based sound which became known as G-funk, starting with "Alwayz Into Somethin'" from Efil4zaggin in 1991. The G-funk style dominated both the West and East Coast hip hop music scene for several years to come.

N.W.A is referenced on Ice Cube's 1990 EP, Kill at Will, where he name-checks his former group (likely in a mocking manner) on the song "Jackin' For Beats". On "I Gotta Say What Up!!!", Ice Cube gives shout-outs to his rap peers at the time, among them Public Enemy, Geto Boys, and Sir Jinx. At the end of the track, in what appears to be an on-the-phone interview, Ice Cube is asked, "Since you went solo, what's up with the rest of the crew?" and the phone is abruptly hung up on the interviewer.

The group's second full-length release, 1991's Efil4zaggin ("Niggaz4Life" spelled backwards), re-established the band in the face of Ice Cube's continued solo success. The album is considered by many Dr. Dre's finest production work, and it heralded the beginning of the G-Funk era. It also showed a clear animosity towards their former member, and derogatory references to Ice Cube are found in several songs. The interlude "A Message to B.A." echoes the beginning of his song "Turn Off the Radio" from AmeriKKKa's Most Wanted: Ice Cube is first addressed by the name Benedict Arnold (after the infamous traitor of the American Revolution) but then named outright in a torrent of abuse from both the group and its fans: "When we see yo' ass, we gon' cut yo' hair off and fuck you with a broomstick" spoken by MC Ren.

The N.W.A–Ice Cube feud eventually escalated, both on record and in real life. AmeriKKKa's Most Wanted had avoided direct attacks on N.W.A, but on Death Certificate, Ice Cube's second full-length release, he retaliated. He sampled and mocked the "Message to B.A." skit before embarking on a full-blown tirade, the infamous "No Vaseline". In a series of verses, Ice Cube verbally assaulted the group: "You lookin' like straight bozos / I saw it comin' that's why I went solo / Kept on stompin' / When y'all Muthafuckas moved Straight outta Compton / You got jealous when I got my own company / But I'm a man, and ain't nobody humpin' me."He also responded to members MC Ren, Dr. Dre, and Eazy-E individually to "100 Miles and Runnin'", claiming "I started off with too much cargo / Dropped four niggaz and now I'm makin' all the dough", using homophobic metaphors to describe their unequal business relationship with Jerry Heller, who became the target of harsh insults:"Get rid of that devil real simple / Put a bullet in his temple / Cuz you can't be the 'Niggaz 4 Life' crew / With a white Jew tellin' you what to do." The song attracted controversy for its antisemitism (the beginning of such accusations against Ice Cube during his affiliation with the Nation of Islam), based on the bashing of Heller's religion.

The track was omitted from the UK release, and later pressings included a censored version of the song. In September 1990, members of hip hop act Above the Law clashed with Ice Cube and his posse Da Lench Mob during the annual New Music Seminar conference, forcing the latter to flee the premises of Times Square's Marriott Marquis, the venue of the event. On January 27, 1991, Dr. Dre assaulted Dee Barnes, host of the hip hop show Pump It Up, after its coverage of the N.W.A/Ice Cube beef. According to Rolling Stone reporter Alan Light:

In response, Dre commented: "People talk all this shit, but you know, if somebody fucks with me, I'm gonna fuck with them. I just did it, you know. Ain't nothing you can do now by talking about it. Besides, it ain't no big thing—I just threw her through a door."

The end of N.W.A (1991–1995)

1991's Niggaz4Life was the group's final album. After Dr. Dre, The D.O.C. and Michel'le departed from Ruthless to join Death Row Records and allegations over Eazy-E being coerced into signing away their contracts (while however retaining a portion of their publishing rights), a bitter rivalry ensued. Dr. Dre began the exchange in 1992 with Death Row's first release, "Fuck Wit Dre Day (And Everybody's Celebratin')", and its accompanying video featured a character named "Sleazy-E" (played by actor A.J. Johnson) who ran around desperately trying to get money. The insults continued on The Chronic with "Bitches Ain't Shit". Eazy-E responded in 1993 with the EP It's On (Dr. Dre) 187um Killa on the tracks "Real Muthaphuckkin G's" and "It's On".

Eazy-E accused Dr. Dre of being a homosexual, calling him a "she thang", and criticizing Dre's new image by calling him and Snoop "studio gangsters". The music video for "Real Muthaphuckkin G's" showed a still of Dre wearing make-up and a sequined jumpsuit. The photos dated back to Dr. Dre's World Class Wreckin' Cru days, when such fashion was common among West Coast electro hop artists, prior to N.W.A's popularization of gangsta rap. Eazy-E kept dissing Dre and Death Row on most of his songs until his AIDS-related death on March 26, 1995.

Even Eazy-E's longtime friend MC Ren voiced his dislike for Eazy-E in 1994, calling Eazy-E a "big-head" and "wannabe mega-star", and even suggesting that N.W.A should reunite without Eazy-E. MC Ren later said that the only relationship he had with Eazy-E was through Ruthless Records, where he released the platinum-selling EP Kizz My Black Azz (1992) and the album Shock of the Hour (1993). Eazy-E and MC Ren ended their feud shortly before the former's death in their 1995 duet '"Tha Muthaphukkin' Real" after two years of not talking to each other. All bad blood finally ceased within the rest of the group. Dr. Dre, MC Ren and Ice Cube later expressed their re-evaluated feelings to their old friend on 1998's "Ruthless for Life", 1999's "What's the Difference" and "Chin Check", 2000's "Hello", 2006's "Growin' Up", and in the 2011 music video "I Need a Doctor".

Reunions (1995–present)
Having both parted with Ruthless Records on bad terms, tensions between Ice Cube and Dr. Dre eventually eased on their own. After Ice Cube made a cameo appearance in Dr. Dre's "Let Me Ride" video in 1993, the two recorded the hit song "Natural Born Killaz" for Snoop Doggy Dogg's 1994 short film and soundtrack Murder Was the Case. Ice Cube also later appeared on MC Ren's album Ruthless for Life on the track "Comin' After You". MC Ren appeared on Dre's 1999 album 2001, and the three remaining N.W.A emcees reunited for "Hello" on Ice Cube's 2000 album War & Peace Vol. 2 (The Peace Disc), and the song "Chin Check" in 1999 for the Next Friday soundtrack, a movie starring Ice Cube.

The West Coast and "gangsta" music scene had however fallen out of the spotlight since the death of Tupac Shakur in 1996, and it was only after Dr. Dre's successful patronage of Eminem and Dre's ensuing comeback album 2001 that the genre and its artists regained the national spotlight. 2000's all-star Up In Smoke Tour reunited much of the N.W.A and Death Row families, and during time spent on the road, Dre, Ice Cube, MC Ren, featured special guest Snoop Dogg and Eminem began recording in a mobile studio. A comeback album entitled Not These Niggaz Again was planned (and included DJ Yella, who had not been present on the tour).

However, due to busy and conflicting schedules as well as the obstacles of coordinating three different record labels (Priority, No Limit and Interscope), obtaining the rights to the name N.W.A and endorsing the whole project to gain exclusive rights, the album never materialized. Only two tracks from these sessions were released: the aforementioned "Chin Check" (with Snoop Dogg as a member of N.W.A) from 2000's Next Friday soundtrack and "Hello" from Ice Cube's 2000 album War & Peace Vol. 2 (The Peace Disc). Both songs also appeared on N.W.A's remastered Greatest Hits. There were also partial reunions on other projects, notably "Set It Off", from Snoop Dogg's Tha Last Meal (2000), which featured MC Ren and Ice Cube, and The D.O.C.'s "The Shit", from his 2003 album Deuce, featuring MC Ren, Ice Cube, Snoop Dogg and Six-Two. Dr. Dre and DJ Yella were present in the studio for the latter song.

In addition to the Greatest Hits initially released by Priority in 1996, Capitol and Ruthless Records jointly released The N.W.A Legacy, Vol. 1: 1988–1998 in 1999, a compilation that contained songs by other rap artists and only three songs from the actual group but various solo tracks from the five members. The success of the album prompted a second volume, The N.W.A Legacy, Vol. 2, three years later. It emulated the format of its predecessor, containing only three genuine N.W.A tracks and many solo efforts by the crew members. In 2007, a new greatest hits package was released, entitled The Best of N.W.A: The Strength of Street Knowledge.

In 2014, Ice Cube appeared on MC Ren's remix for "Rebel Music". This was the first time the duo had worked together since the N.W.A reunion in 2000.

On June 27, 2015, MC Ren and DJ Yella joined Ice Cube during his solo set as part of the BET Experience show at the Staples Center in Los Angeles, California. This marked the first reunion performance of the group (minus Dr. Dre) in 15 years. Following a 27-year hiatus, the group reunited with surviving members Ice Cube, MC Ren, Dr. Dre and DJ Yella taking the stage during the second weekend of the Coachella Valley Music and Arts Festival in April 2016, just days following the group's Rock N' Roll Hall of Fame induction.

Members
 Arabian Prince (1987–1988)
 DJ Yella (1987–1991, 1999–2002, 2015, 2016)
 Dr. Dre (1987–1991, 1999–2002, 2016)
 Eazy-E (1987–1991; died 1995)
 Ice Cube (1987–1989, 1999–2002, 2015, 2016)
 MC Ren (1988–1991, 1999–2002, 2015, 2016)

Timeline

Biopic

New Line Cinema representatives announced to Entertainment Weekly's "Hollywood Insider Blog" that N.W.A's story was in development to become a feature film for theatrical release in 2012. However, it was delayed to sometime in 2014. The script was researched and written by filmmaker S. Leigh Savidge and radio veteran Alan Wenkus, who worked closely with Eazy-E's widow, Tomica Woods-Wright. Ice Cube and Dr. Dre act as producers of the film. In September 2011, John Singleton was selected as director. Ice Cube and Singleton previously collaborated on Boyz n the Hood, a movie that was nominated for an Academy Award, and Ice Cube also played the part of the character "Fudge" in Singleton's Higher Learning.

Casting calls began in the summer of 2010. There were rumors of Lil Eazy-E playing his late father Eazy-E, and Ice Cube's son and fellow rapper O'Shea Jackson Jr. playing his father as well. Ice Cube stated of the movie, "We're taking it to the nooks and crannies, I think deeper than any other article or documentary on the group," he said. "These are the intimate conversations that helped forge N.W.A. To me, I think it's interesting to anybody who loves that era and I don't know any other movie where you can mix Gangster Rap, the F.B.I., L.A. riots, HIV, and fucking feuding with each other. This movie has everything from Darryl Gates and the battering ram."

In August 2012, F. Gary Gray was selected as director rather than Singleton. The film, named Straight Outta Compton, had been picked up by Universal Pictures who hired Jonathan Herman in December 2013 to draft a new script and brought in Will Packer to executive produce.N.W.A Casting Call: Who Should Play Ice Cube, Dr. Dre In 'Straight Outta Compton'?. MTV.com (January 8, 2014). Retrieved on 2014-04-11. On February 21, 2014, director F. Gary Gray announced a March 9, 2014 open casting call for the film via his Twitter account. There were also open casting calls in Atlanta and Chicago.'N.W.A.' biopic to hold casting call in Chicago - Chicago Tribune. Articles.chicagotribune.com (March 13, 2014). Retrieved on 2014-04-11. Rapper YG auditioned to play MC Ren in the film. The project was scheduled to start filming in April 2014 but was pushed backed due to casting delays.

On June 18, 2014, Universal announced that the N.W.A biopic Straight Outta Compton would be released August 14, 2015. Ice Cube's son, O'Shea Jackson Jr., plays a younger version of his father in the movie, while Jason Mitchell plays Eazy-E, Corey Hawkins plays Dr. Dre, Aldis Hodge plays MC Ren, and Neil Brown Jr. plays DJ Yella. In early July 2014, casting directors for the N.W.A biopic issued a casting call for extras and vintage cars in the Los Angeles area for scenes in the movie. The film received positive reviews and grossed over $200 million worldwide.

Legacy

Although the group disbanded in 1991, it remains one of the greatest and most influential hip-hop groups, leaving a lasting legacy on hip hop music in the following decades. Its influence, from the use of funky, bass-driven beats to its exaggerated lyrics, was evident throughout the 1990s and even into the present, and is often credited as bridging the white/black American musical lines with its appeal to white Americans in the late 1980s.

In Dr. Dre's 1999 single "Forgot About Dre", Eminem pays homage to the group, rapping "So what do you say to somebody you hate / Or anyone tryna bring trouble your way? / Wanna resolve things in a bloodier way? / Just study a tape of N.W.A", possibly referring to the negative reception of N.W.A's works by mainstream radio, which considered the group's songs violent.

A scene in the music video for the 2005 single "Hate It or Love It" by The Game featuring 50 Cent shows Tequan Richmond and Zachary Williams (portraying a youthful Game & 50 Cent respectively) being caught spraypainting "N.W.A" on a wall, resulting in their subsequent arrest by two policemen. The Game also has a tattoo that says "N.W.A" on the right side of his chest.

Discography

Studio albums
 Straight Outta Compton (1988)
 Niggaz4Life (1991)

Extended plays100 Miles and Runnin' (1990)

Compilation albums
 N.W.A. and the Posse (1987)
 Greatest Hits (1996)
 Straight Outta Compton: N.W.A 10th Anniversary Tribute (1998)
 The N.W.A Legacy, Vol. 1: 1988–1998 (1999)
 The N.W.A Legacy, Vol. 2 (2002)
 The Best of N.W.A: The Strength of Street Knowledge (2006)
 Family Tree'' (2008)

Tour 
 Straight Outta Compton Tour (1989)

See also
Fear of a Black Hat

References

1986 establishments in California
1991 disestablishments in California
African-American musical groups
Dr. Dre
Eazy-E
Gangsta rap groups
Hip hop groups from California
Ice Cube
MC Ren
Musical groups disestablished in 1991
Musical groups established in 1986
Musical groups from Los Angeles
 
Obscenity controversies in music
Priority Records artists
Ruthless Records artists
West Coast hip hop groups